Bagh-e Molla or Bagh Molla may refer to:
 Bagh-e Molla, Fars
 Bagh-e Molla, Kerman
 Bagh-e Molla, Khuzestan